The National Agency for Cultural Heritage Preservation of Georgia (sak'art'velos kulturuli memkvidreobis datsvis saagento) is a government agency in Georgia responsible for preservation, protection, research and promotion of cultural heritage of the country. The agency was established in 2008, bringing several major heritage monument complexes of national and global significance in Georgia under its umbrella. The agency is headed by Director General, a position occupied by the art historian Nikoloz Vacheishvili since November 2008.

Components
The monument complexes united under the National Agency for Cultural Heritage Preservation of Georgia are:
Greater Mtskheta Archaeological Museum-Reserve — a series of monuments and archaeological sites in and around the town of Mtskheta, which are inscribed as a UNESCO World Heritage Site.  
Vardzia Historical-Architectural Museum-Reserve — the cave town and monasteries in Vardzia.  
Uplistsikhe Historical-Architectural Museum-Reserve — the cave town in Uplistsikhe. 
Ksani Valley Historical-Architectural Museum-Reserve — the historical monuments in the Ksani River valley. 
Petra-Tsikhisdziri Archaeological-Architectural Museum-Reserve — ruins of the fortified Roman town of Petra at Tsikhisdziri.  
Gonio-Apsaros Archaeological-Architectural Museum-Reserve — archaeological complex of Gonio, including the ancient fortress of Apsaros.  
Kldekari Historical-Architectural Museum-Reserve — ancient and medieval fortification systems of Kldekari.
Nokalakevi Architectural-Archaeological Museum-Reserve — ruins of ancient and medieval town of Nokalakevi. 
Archaeological Museum-Reserve of Guria — archaeological museum and ruined monastic complexes in the region of Guria. 
Didi Liakhvi Valley State Museum-Reserve — monuments of the Greater Liakhvi River valley. 
Kutaisi Historical-Architectural Museum-Reserve — monuments in and around Kutaisi, including the UNESCO World Heritage sites, Gelati monastery and Bagrati cathedral. 
Stepantsminda History Museum — a history museum in Stepantsminda. 
Borjomi Local History Museum — a history museum in Borjomi. 
Niko Pirosmanishvili State Museum — a museum centered on the works of the Georgian painter Niko Pirosmanishvili (1862–1918) in Mirzaani.
The wider tasks of the agency include preservation, protection and promotion of museums, reserves, moveable and immoveable monuments and sites of the Georgian cultural heritage throughout Georgia and beyond the country, archaeological expeditions, as well as development and implementation of cultural, education and tourist programs to popularize the Georgian cultural heritage. The agency has also been involved in negotiations with foreign government over the protection of Georgian cultural heritage in respective countries, such as Turkey and Cyprus.

See also 
 Intangible Cultural Heritage of Georgia

References

Government agencies of Georgia (country)
Heritage organizations
History organisations based in Georgia (country)
Historic sites in Georgia (country)
Government agencies established in 2008
2008 establishments in Georgia (country)